Kosovo national youth football teams results may refer to:

Men's
Under-21
Kosovo national under-21 football team results (2013–19)
Kosovo national under-21 football team results (2020–present)

Under-19
Kosovo national under-19 football team results (2017–19)
Kosovo national under-19 football team results (2020–present)

Under-17
Kosovo national under-17 football team results (2017–19)
Kosovo national under-17 football team results (2020–present)

Women's
Under-19
Kosovo national under-19 football team results (2017–19)
Kosovo national under-19 football team results (2020–present)